The Joke's on You is a 1925 American comedy film featuring Oliver Hardy.

Cast
 Billy West as Hubby
 Oliver Hardy as Wilbert Perkins (as Babe Hardy)
 Ethelyn Gibson as Wifey (as Ethlyn Gibson)

See also
 List of American films of 1925
 Oliver Hardy filmography

External links

1925 films
1925 comedy films
1925 short films
American black-and-white films
Films directed by Ralph Ceder
American silent short films
Silent American comedy films
American comedy short films
1920s American films